The Ware Case is a 1928 British silent drama film directed by H. Manning Haynes and starring Stewart Rome, Betty Carter and Ian Fleming. The film was shot at the Twickenham Studios in London with sets designed by the art director Hugh Gee. It was an adaptation of the play The Ware Case by George Pleydell Bancroft, previously filmed in 1917, with another version appearing in 1938. First National (through Warner Bros.) distributed the film in the United States.

Synopsis
A selfish, spendthrift baronet is accused of murdering his wife's wealthy brother. The barrister defending him is secretly in love with his wife, but managed to get him acquitted by the jury. However, doubts still remain about his culpability.

Cast
 Stewart Rome as Sir Hubert Ware 
 Betty Carter as Lady Magda Ware 
 Ian Fleming as Michael Adye 
 Cameron Carr as Inspector Watkins 
 Cynthia Murtagh as Celia Gurney 
 Patrick Ludlow as Eustace Ede 
 Wellington Briggs as Sir Henry Egerton 
 Patrick Stewart as Marston Gurney 
 Syd Ellery as Tommy Bold 
 John Valentine as Attorney General

References

Bibliography
 Low, Rachael. History of the British Film, 1918-1929. George Allen & Unwin, 1971.
 Wood, Linda. British Films, 1927-1939. British Film Institute, 1986.

External links

1928 films
1928 drama films
British drama films
British films based on plays
Films set in England
Films shot at Twickenham Film Studios
First National Pictures films
Films set in London
British black-and-white films
British silent feature films
1920s English-language films
Films directed by H. Manning Haynes
1920s British films
Silent drama films